Thoressa is a genus of skipper butterflies erected by Charles Swinhoe in 1913. They (like some other skippers) are commonly known as "aces" or "ace butterflies". The genus is endemic to Southeast Asia with many species endemic to China.

Species include:
 Thoressa aina (de Nicéville, 1889) Sikkim
 Thoressa astigmata (C. Swinhoe, 1890) southern spotted ace or unbranded ace
 Thoressa baileyi (South, 1913) China
 Thoressa blanchardii (Mabille, 1876) China
 Thoressa bivitta (Oberthür, 1886) China
 Thoressa cerata (Hewitson, 1876) Sikkim, Myanmar, Thailand, Laos
 Thoressa cuneomaculata (Murayama, 1995) China
 Thoressa decorata (Moore, 1881) decorated ace
 Thoressa evershedi (Evans, 1910) Evershed's ace
 Thoressa fusca (Elwes, [1893]) Northeast India, Myanmar, China, Indochina
 Thoressa gupta de Nicéville, 1886 Sikkim, China
 Thoressa hishikawai (Yoshino, 2003) China
 Thoressa honorei (de Nicéville, 1887) Madras ace
 Thoressa horishama (Matsumura, 1910) Formosa
 Thoressa horishana (Matsumura) sic Formosa
 Thoressa hyrie (de Nicéville, 1891)
 Thoressa justini Inoue, 1969 Philippines
 Thoressa latris (Leech, 1894) China
 Thoressa kuata (Evans, 1940) China
 Thoressa luanchuanensis (Wang & Niu, 2002) China
 Thoressa masoni (Moore, [1879])
 Thoressa monastyrskyi Devyatkin, 1996 Vietnam
 Thoressa masuriensis (Moore, 1878)
 Thoressa nanshaona Murayama, 1995 China
 Thoressa panda (Evans, 1937) Naga Hills
 Thoressa pandita (de Nicéville, 1885)
 Thoressa pedla (Evans, 1956) China
 Thoressa serena (Evans, 1937) China
 Thoressa similissima Devyatkin, 2002 Vietnam
 Thoressa sitala (de Nicéville, 1885) Tamil ace or Sitala ace
 Thoressa submacula (Leech, 1890) China, Vietnam
 Thoressa thandaunga (Evans, 1926) Karen Hills
 Thoressa varia (Murray, 1875)
 Thoressa viridis (Huang, 2003) China
 Thoressa xiaoqingae Huang & Zhan, 2004 China
 Thoressa zinnia (Evans, 1939) China

Biology
The larvae feed on Gramineae including Sasa

References

  Taxonomy, distribution

External links

 
Hesperiidae genera